All Saints Neck, is a mountain pass situated in the Eastern Cape, province of South Africa, on the Regional R61, the road between Umtata and Engcobo.

References

Mountain passes of the Eastern Cape